Martín Alund and Facundo Bagnis were the defending champions but decided not to participate.
Dutch team of Stephan Fransen and Wesley Koolhof won their first title as a team defeating Roman Borvanov and Alexander Satschko.

Seeds

Draw

Draw

References
 Main Draw

Challenger Ciudad de Guayaquil - Doubles
2013 Doubles